The 1997–98 Coca-Cola Triangular Series was a One Day International cricket tournament held in India in May 1998. It was a tri-nation series between Bangladesh, India and Kenya. India defeated Kenya in the final to win the tournament.

Squads

India
Mohammad Azharuddin (captain)
Rahul Dravid
Sachin Tendulkar
Sourav Ganguly
Ajay Jadeja
Robin Singh
Debasis Mohanty
Anil Kumble
Ajit Agarkar
Venkatesh Prasad
Nayan Mongia (wicket keeper)
Rahul Sanghvi
Hrishikesh Kanitkar
Paras Mhambrey
Nikhil Chopra
Harbhajan Singh
Gagan Khoda
Navjot Singh Sidhu
Jatin Paranjpe
VVS Laxman
Nilesh Kulkarni
Saba Karim (wicket keeper)
MSK Prasad (wicket keeper)

Bangladesh
Akram Khan remaining matches (captain)
Khaled Mahmud
Mohammad Rafique
Athar Ali Khan
Enamul Haque
Hasibul Hossain
Morshed Ali Khan
Naimur Rahman
Anisur Rahman
Khaled Mashud (wicket keeper)
Aminul Islam  only for 1st match (captain)
Minhajul Abedin
Mehrab Hossain
Sanwar Hossain

Kenya
Aasif Karim (captain)
Steve Tikolo
Mohammad Sheikh
Maurice Odumbe
Martin Suji
Joseph Angara
Thomas Odoyo
Ravi Shah
Hitesh Modi
Lameck Onyango
Kennedy Otieno (wicket keeper)
Dipak Chudasama
Tony Suji
Alpesh Vadher

Points table
India and Kenya advanced to the Finals on the basis of points.

Matches

1st ODI

2nd ODI

3rd ODI

4th ODI

5th ODI

6th ODI

Final

References

External links
 Series home at ESPN Cricinfo
 Series home at ESPN Cricinfo archive

Bangladeshi cricket in the 20th century
Kenyan cricket in the 20th century
1998 in Indian cricket
International cricket competitions from 1997–98 to 2000
Bangladeshi cricket tours of India
Kenyan cricket tours abroad